Kewpie is a brand of dolls and figurines.

Kewpie may also refer to:

As a nickname:
 Dick Barrett (baseball) (1906-1966), American Major League Baseball pitcher
 Johnny Ertel (1897-1976), Hungarian-born American boxer
Kewpie (drag artist) (1942-2012), South African drag artist and hairdresser
 Kewpie Morgan (1892-1956), American silent film actor
 Kewpie Pennington (1896-1953), American Major League Baseball pitcher (for one game)
 Kewpie Ross, silent film actor - see the Ton of Fun comedy team

Other uses:
 Kewpie Chasma, a chasm on Ariel, a moon of the planet Uranus - see List of geological features on Ariel
 , a Japanese brand of mayonnaise
 Kewpie, a character in the 1935 Broadway play Paradise Lost and the film adaptation
 the sports teams of David H. Hickman High School, Columbia, Missouri, United States

See also
 Archdale Parkhill (1878-1947), Australian politician nicknamed "Sir Kewpie"
 Kewpee, the second known chain of hamburger fast-food restaurants, founded in 1923

Lists of people by nickname